In enzymology, a 6-endo-hydroxycineole dehydrogenase is an enzyme that catalyzes the chemical reaction

6-endo-hydroxycineole + NAD+  6-oxocineole + NADH + H+

Thus, the two substrates of this enzyme are 6-endo-hydroxycineole and NAD+, whereas its 3 products are 6-oxocineole, NADH, and H+.

This enzyme belongs to the family of oxidoreductases, specifically those acting on the CH-OH group of donor with NAD+ or NADP+ as acceptor. The systematic name of this enzyme class is 6-endo-hydroxycineole:NAD+ 6-oxidoreductase. This enzyme participates in terpenoid biosynthesis.

References

 

EC 1.1.1
NADH-dependent enzymes
Enzymes of unknown structure